Oetz is a municipality in the Imst district of Tyrol, Austria, located 11.7 km (7.3 mi) southeast of Imst at the lower course of the Ötztaler Ache in the outer Ötztal valley at the foot of Acherkogel mountain (3 008 m, 9,869 ft).

History
Settlement of the area around Oetz began around two thousand years ago. The village was mentioned for the first time as Ez in 1266. The parish church was constructed in the Late Gothic style, with extensions in 1667. Baroque interior alterations were completed in 1744. The church contains a crypt, an altar with a painting of St. Michael (1683), carvings and statues.

Population

Tourism
Ötz is a bi-seasonal tourist resort with approximately 350,000 overnight stays, and is a popular location for rafting and tourism. The town has a local heritage museum and art gallery called the Turmmuseum Ötz (formerly the Galerie zum alten Ötztal). Nearby attractions include Lake Piburg, the Auer Klamm (gorge), the Stuibenfall (waterfall), and the waterfall on the Tumpenbach (stream). The municipality has 2,265 inhabitants.

Town partnerships
Ötz fosters partnerships with the following places:
 Hargesheim, Rhineland-Palatinate, Germany

References

External links
 Oetz
 Ötztal

Cities and towns in Imst District